Olivarius may refer to:

People
 Ann Olivarius, an American-British lawyer
 Dorotheus Olivarius Lavik (1863–1908), a Norwegian actor and theatre director
 Peder Olivarius Bugge (1764–1849), a Norwegian bishop
 (1847-1905), Danish architect
Olivarius Vredus, Latinized pen name of Olivier de Wree (1596-1652),  new Latin poet and historian from the Habsburg Netherlands

Other
Nucleus olivarius (inf. & sup.)
Olivarius Hotels, California, United States
Hercules Olivarius, "Hercules the Olive-Bearer" an epithet of Hercules

See also 
 Oliver (given name)

References 

Latin-language surnames